Josef Hildebrand may refer to:

Josef Hildebrand (politician) (1855–1935), Swiss politician and president of the Swiss Council of States
Josef Hildebrand (fencer) (1895–?), Czech fencer